Desailly is a surname. Notable people with the surname include:

 Claude Desailly (1922–2009), French screenwriter
 Jean Desailly (1920–2008), French actor
 Marcel Desailly (born 1968), French footballer

See also
 Desailly, Queensland, a locality in Shire of Mareeba, Australia